Haji-Alilu (ḤĀJI ʿALILU) (حاج علیلو) is one on the six major Tribes of Arasbaran. It is a Turkic tribe with two branches; one dwelling in the vicinity of Maragheh, and main branch lives north of Varzaqan and Ahar in the Qarājadāḡ region of East Azerbaijan Province of Iran. In the wake of Russo-Persian War (1804–13) Haji-Alilu comprised 800 tents. During Persian Constitutional Revolution, the tribe's head, Amir Arshad,  supported the  revolutionary forces against the Chalabianlu tribe and their allies, who, under the leadership of Rahimkhan Chalabianloo, had been the major supporters of the deposed Mohammad Ali Shah Qajar.

References

Pastoralists
Azerbaijani tribes
Ethnic groups in Iran
Ethnic groups in Azerbaijan